Oddvar J. Majala (9 March 1932 – 3 March 2022) was a Norwegian Labour Party politician. He was elected to the Stortinget from Finnmark in 1981.

Majala was deputy mayor of Måsøy from 1975 to 1979 and mayor from 1979 to 1981.

Stortings committees 
1985–1989 member of Maritime and fisheries committee
1985–1989 deputy member of Electoral committee
1981–1985 member of Maritime and fisheries committee
1981–1985 deputy member of Electoral committee

References

External links

1932 births
2022 deaths
People from Måsøy
Labour Party (Norway) politicians
Members of the Storting
Mayors of Måsøy
20th-century Norwegian politicians